D-type asteroids have a very low albedo and a featureless reddish spectrum. It has been suggested that they have a composition of organic-rich silicates, carbon and anhydrous silicates, possibly with water ice in their interiors. D-type asteroids are found in the outer asteroid belt and beyond; examples are 152 Atala, and 944 Hidalgo as well as the majority of Jupiter trojans.  It has been suggested that the Tagish Lake meteorite was a fragment from a D-type asteroid, and that the Martian moon Phobos is closely related.

The Nice model suggests that D-type asteroids may have originated in the Kuiper belt.    46 D-type asteroids are known, including: 3552 Don Quixote, 944 Hidalgo, 624 Hektor, and 10199 Chariklo.

Examples 

A list of some of the largest D-type asteroids.

See also 
 Asteroid spectral types
 Tagish Lake (meteorite)

References 
 

Asteroid spectral classes
D-type asteroids